Jenny Mannerheim is an Art Director, Editor and Curator born in Stockholm, Sweden in 1977.

Education
Central Saint Martin's School of design, graphic design program, 2000.
Bachelor of Fine Arts, Parsons School of Design, Communication design, 2002.
Henry Wolf Scholarship, 2002.

Career
Designer of artist book Punk Picasso by Larry Clark. (AKA Editions, 2003)

Art director for various fashion magazines such as Numéro, Vogue Hommes International and Beaux Arts magazine.
Artistic direction, editorial concepts,  Fashion shoots, casting, graphic design & layout, management of the design department for digital and print production in printed media.

Founder, Publisher and Creative Director of Nuke magazine, 2004.
Owner and Director of Galerie Nuke, opened in 2005.
Nuke 'Generation Polluée' is an art magazine on the theme of Art & Ecology to serve as an extended “self-portrait of a Polluted Generation” by giving space and opportunities for young artists, writers and designers to express themselves.

Since 2006 Art Director of the huge contemporary art book series called "Made by" published by art dealer Enrico Navarra and directed by Fabrice Bousteau, editor-in-chief of Beaux arts Magazine.
Made by Indians, 2007. Published by Enrico Navarra.
In the Arab world...Now, 2008. Published by Enrico Navarra.

Since 2008 Art Director of Blast, Intersection and ExtraSmall magazine.

Jury of Le Club des Directeurs Artistiques 2009.

Creative director & Curator Jenny Mannerheim develops cultural content with artists and talents for companies such as Persol, Lancôme, Nissan, Tommy Hilfiger, PlayStation, Diesel, Renault, Mikli, Ducati, Fiat, Jeep, Citroen, Vans, Samsung with agencies Publicis, TBWA, Havas, Digitas, Marcel, Cheil, Mazarine.

Art consultant & Curator of programming at the Eden Rock Gallery and Wall House Museum, St Barth.
Contemporary art is highlighted in exhibitions and installations on the island of St Barth. Exhibited the celebrated Brooklyn-based artist KAWS, as well as Daniel Arsham, Lionel Esteve and Terry Richardson in partnership with Galerie Perrotin and Art Saint Barth.
Curator of solo shows and  artist residencies with Robert Montgomery, Jean-Charles de Castelbajac, Douglas White, Blair Chivers.

Creative Director and co-founder of EACH x OTHER a collaborative fashion brand, a fusion between contemporary artists, musicians, poets, filmmakers and fashion designers. EACH x OTHER acts as a label and media for artists to produce fashion related designs, items and limited edition art multiples. 

Art director of the Arabesque, Maximum India, Nordic Cool ‘Memorial’ books. The festivals, curated by Alicia Adams, includes dozens of performances by some of the world's best contemporary music, dance, and theater artists. Visual arts are highlighted in exhibitions and installations around the building, and additional events focus on literature, film, cuisine, and more. 

Owner of Paris gallery space Mannerheim Gallery (Nuke).
Contemporary art is curated in group and solo exhibitions in the Paris gallery space and outside the gallery walls in Art Centers and Art Fairs since 2004. Artists exhibited Robert Montgomery, Jean-Charles de Castelbajac, Alizé Meurisse, Douglas White, La Fratrie, Jeremy Kost, Marc Horowitz, Annabel Briens, Charles Derenne, Ann Grim, Francois Mangeol, Fabio Paleari, Cyprien Gaillard, Camille Henrot, Gianni Motti.

References

External links 
Theparisoffice.com - Jenny Mannerheim's website

1977 births
Living people
Swedish art directors
Swedish art curators
Swedish women curators